Robin Francis Trott (born 17 August 1974) is an English football player and manager.

Career
Trott began his career at Gillingham, where he made ten league appearances but found himself unable to command a regular first team place. In 1995, he left the club to try his luck in Hong Kong but returned to England the following year, where he has gone on to carve out a career in non-league football. A successful first season with Welling United saw him signed by Stevenage Borough for £8,000. He later played for Grays Athletic and Gravesend & Northfleet.

He served as player-manager of Margate from April 2006 until April 2008. He later had a short spell with Welling United, before signing for Billericay Town to begin a third spell with the Essex-based club. His third debut with The Blues came against Ramsgate on 25 October 2008.

References

1974 births
Living people
Footballers from Orpington
English footballers
Association football defenders
Gillingham F.C. players
Hastings United F.C. players
Mansion (football) players
Welling United F.C. players
Stevenage F.C. players
Grays Athletic F.C. players
Ebbsfleet United F.C. players
Billericay Town F.C. players
Heybridge Swifts F.C. players
Margate F.C. players
English Football League players
National League (English football) players
English football managers
Margate F.C. managers